Protect America was a home security company based in Austin, Texas.

Company history
The company was founded in 1992 by Thad Paschall in Austin, Texas—where it was headquartered. By 2001, the company had installed about 200,000 security systems. In 2010 the company was purchased by Rockbridge Growth Equity LLC from Falcon Investments under advisement from Imperial Capital. The total cost of the company was about $100 million. The company was ranked among SDM Magazine’s top 15 U.S. security system providers as of 2014. In 2012 Protect America expanded into Canada, and had about 400,000 customers. In 2013 the company had 390 employees, adding 67 jobs that year, the 13th most that year in the state of Texas according to Inc. Magazine. Protect America also provides public security system advice on US television networks. In 2020, Protect America was acquired by Brinks Home Security.

Security systems
In 2005, the company produced the first monitored self-installed security system business model. The company also offered mobile apps that allowed customers to interact with their home security systems while away from their residences, called the SMART connect app. Security packages were offered at different pricing, in both hardline and cellular models.

Philanthropy
Protect America has teamed with universities such as Michigan State University and the University of South Alabama to help students provide aid to local area charities. It has also partnered directly with the Austin Police Department, providing financing for police initiatives, including the updating of their security equipment.

References

External links
Protect America Website
Security Systems Installation

1992 establishments in Texas
Security companies of the United States
Companies based in Austin, Texas
Privately held companies based in Texas
Rock Ventures
American companies established in 1992
2010 mergers and acquisitions